Veľká Franková is a village and municipality in Kežmarok District in the Prešov Region of north Slovakia. The village is traditionally inhabited by Rusyns, as one of their westernmost settlements (together with Malá Franková and Osturňa).

History
In historical records the village was first mentioned in 1296.

Geography
The municipality lies at an altitude of 664 metres and covers an area of 10.635 km². It has a population of about 380 people.

References

External links
http://velkafrankova.e-obce.sk

Villages and municipalities in Kežmarok District